Holden Hill is a suburb in the inner north-eastern suburbs of Adelaide, the capital of South Australia. It is around 10 km from the Adelaide CBD.

Government 
Holden Hill is in both the City of Port Adelaide Enfield and City of Tea Tree Gully local government areas, and is in both the South Australian House of Assembly electoral districts of Florey and Torrens. It is also in the Australian House of Representatives Division of Sturt.

The suburb is named after "Holden's Hill", a name given to a road extension in 1855. The road ran through land owned by Mr R. Halden who was an avid fan of Holden vehicles after 1935.

Holden Hill Police station is located here.

Shopping 
Holden Hill is close to Tea Tree Plaza shopping centre mall. It is also close to Gilles Plains shopping centre.

Education 
Kildare College is located within Holden Hill, it is a single sex private school specialising in education of girls from primary school to high school.

Leisure 
The Linear Park bike path is close to Holden Hill and is easily accessible by locals. It forms a path to Adelaide City along the Torrens Catchment.

Local cinemas are located at Tea Tree Plaza, Hoyts Cinema.

It is also near the Valley View Golf Course.

Economy
Former bike frame manufacturer, Ciombola, had a factory in Holden Hill.

References

Suburbs of Adelaide